Anasimyia chrysostoma, the lump-legged swamp fly , is a fairly common species of syrphid fly observed across the United States and Canada. Hoverflies can remain nearly motionless in flight. The adults are also known as flower flies for they are commonly found on flowers from which they get both energy-giving nectar and protein-rich pollen. Larvae of this genus are of the rat-tailed type living in aquatic environments.

References

Eristalinae
Insects described in 1830
Insects of the United States
Hoverflies of North America
Insects of Canada
Taxa named by Christian Rudolph Wilhelm Wiedemann